Kalindaruk may refer to:
a subdivision of the Ohlone people
Kalindaruk, California, a former settlement in Monterey County, California